Nishant Tanwar (born on 7 November 1982), also known as 'Joke Singh' and more recently as 'Rider OP' is an Indian Stand-up comedian and actor. He started off his professional career working at NDTV, and began doing stand-up in 2009 when he found his passion for the same at an open mic event.

Apart from corporate shows,  Nishant has performed and conceptualized comedy specials like Comedy in Diversity, Two and a Laugh Men, and Third World Comedy and is the founding member of IPL (Improv Premier League), Delhi's foremost improv comedy troupe.

Career

Nishant first worked at NDTV as an editor. When stand-up comedy was just hitting the peak, he quit his career in the media industry and became a full-time comedian. He is one of the prominent face amidst Delhi and Gurgaon stand-up comedy circles. Taking digs at stereotypes and Indian culture, Nishant Tanwar's humor is universal—connecting with all segments of people breaking social and age group barriers. He recently gained more popularity on social media and completed his half million subscribers on YouTube due to his standup comic with Amazon Prime's Delhi Se Hoon B******d.

Notable performances

Nishant's performance in Gurgaon, on the Raaghiri Day conducted by The Times of India was completely sold out. Tanwar also hosted the "Joke Joker Jokest" event at Kolkata organized by The Times of India, with noted comedians Sourav Ghosh, Vaibhav Sethia, Anirban Dasgupta, and Abhijit Ganguly.

Nishant Tanwar has also been a part of Comedy Central's Improv shows on television. He has performed to packed auditoriums nationally in Mumbai, Delhi, Bangalore, Gurgaon, and Kolkata as well as international audiences in Philippines, Thailand, Singapore, Malaysia, and Indonesia. He also performed with Zakir Khan (comedian) at Gurgaon.

Nishant Tanwar Live- The New Special was presented by Comedy Circuit in Kolkata in 2019. Which was also recorded for Amazon Prime Video. He constantly started streaming with the pseudonym 'Rider OP' during the COVID-19 pandemic, and has been noted for some appreciable reaction videos, both single and joint with former AIB specialist Tanmay Bhat.

Web

References

External links 

Living people
Indian stand-up comedians
Indian male comedians
1982 births